Silvan Palazot (born 5 June 1980) is a French freestyle skier. He competed in the men's moguls event at the 2006 Winter Olympics.

References

External links
 

1980 births
Living people
French male freestyle skiers
Olympic freestyle skiers of France
Freestyle skiers at the 2006 Winter Olympics
People from Thonon-les-Bains
Sportspeople from Haute-Savoie